Zachary Robert Loyd (born July 18, 1987) is an American soccer player who last played for Atlanta United. He also played for FC Dallas in Major League Soccer (MLS) and represented the USMNT. Loyd is currently the head coach for Lone Star Republic in the United Premier Soccer League.

Career

College and amateur
Loyd is the one of four sons of Alan and Kathleen Loyd. Loyd grew up in Verdigris, Oklahoma, attended Verdigris High School and played college soccer at the University of North Carolina (UNC) from 2006 to 2009. While at UNC, Loyd scored 7 goals and recorded 10 assists. Loyd also garnered a spot on the NCAA College Cup All-Tournament Team his junior year. Loyd assisted Brian Shriver for a game-winning goal against No. 1 Wake Forest in the national semifinal, advancing UNC to the College Cup final to face Maryland. During his college years Loyd also played for Carolina Dynamo in the USL Premier Development League.

At the 2010 MLS SuperDraft Combine, experts praised Loyd's efforts, saying, "If Tchani was the best player at the combine, Loyd was the second most impressive. His ability to play well at whatever position he was put in showed off all of his many qualities, including a good passing touch, hard-nosed defending, a good ability to read the game, and surprising pace." "He's just a good all-around player, and the scary part is, he didn't really play much at what is probably his best position, defensive midfield," said another MLS head coach. "In our league, where you have the salary cap and the small roster, finding a player who can help you at a variety of positions is like finding gold."

Professional
Loyd was drafted in the first round (5th overall) of the 2010 MLS SuperDraft by FC Dallas. He made his professional debut on April 10, 2010, in a game against Columbus Crew with Loyd playing all 90 minutes of the 2–2 draw. During the 2010 MLS season, Loyd appeared in 24 matches and started 19 of them. Loyd was named to the MLS Team of Week 1 of the 2011 season for his performance against the Chicago Fire. He scored his first MLS goal on June 25, 2011, during a 4–0 win against the Portland Timbers. The goal came off a corner kick from Daniel Hernandez. Loyd scored FC Dallas' opening goal for the 2012 MLS season, in a match against the New York Red Bulls.

Loyd spent his early years with Dallas primarily as the starting right back. In his later years, he primarily played more as a center back. After an injury cut short his 2016 season, Loyd was selected by Atlanta United in the 2016 expansion draft. 
After being put on the season-ending injury list in August 2017 the option on his contract was declined at the end of the 2017 season. His only game for Atlanta came in the US Open Cup.

International
On January 22, 2011, Loyd made his international debut in a friendly match against Chile, where he started at the left-back position. The game ended in a 1–1 draw with Loyd playing 73 minutes. He was named Man of the Match.

Personal life
During his time at North Carolina, Loyd majored in exercise and sport science, and planned a career as a teacher and coach after soccer. Loyd has three brothers, two of whom played at Benedictine College. He married professional soccer player Casey Nogueira, whom he met when they both played soccer at North Carolina, on October 13, 2012. The couple coach Vickery United, a youth soccer team for refugees in the North Dallas neighborhood of Vickery Meadow.

Honors

University of North Carolina
 NCAA College Cup All-Tournament Team (1): 2008
 NCAA Final Four Appearances (2): 2008, 2009

FC Dallas
 Major League Soccer Western Conference Championship (1): 2010
 Major League Soccer Supporters' Shield (1): 2016
 Lamar Hunt U.S. Open Cup (1): 2016

References

External links
 
 North Carolina bio
 

1987 births
Living people
People from Rogers County, Oklahoma
American soccer players
Soccer players from Oklahoma
North Carolina Fusion U23 players
FC Dallas players
Atlanta United FC players
North Carolina Tar Heels men's soccer players
USL League Two players
Major League Soccer players
United States men's international soccer players
FC Dallas draft picks
Association football defenders
All-American men's college soccer players
American soccer coaches